The Central District of Rudbar Jonubi County is a district (bakhsh) in Rudbar-e Jonubi County, Kerman Province, Iran. At the 2006 census, its population was 50,292, in 10,069 families.  The district has one city: Rudbar.  The district has two rural districts (dehestan): Nehzatabad Rural District and Rudbar Rural District.

References 

Rudbar-e Jonubi County
Districts of Kerman Province